The 1931–32 Sheffield Shield season was the 36th season of the Sheffield Shield, the domestic first-class cricket competition of Australia. New South Wales won the championship by virtue of having a better average.

Table

Statistics

Most Runs
Vic Richardson 690

Most Wickets
Clarrie Grimmett 29

References

Sheffield Shield
Sheffield Shield
Sheffield Shield seasons